Uno (from Spanish and Italian for 'one'; stylized as UNO) is an American shedding-type card game that is played with a specially printed deck. The game's general principles put it into the crazy eights family of card games, and it is similar to the traditional European game mau-mau.

It has been a Mattel brand since 1992.

History

The game was originally developed in 1971 by Merle Robbins in Reading, Ohio, a suburb of Cincinnati. When his family and friends began to play more and more, he spent $8,000 to have 5,000 copies of the game made. He sold it from his barbershop at first, and local businesses began to sell it as well. Robbins later sold the rights to Uno to a group of friends headed by Robert Tezak, a funeral parlor owner in Joliet, Illinois, for $50,000 plus royalties of 10 cents per game. Tezak formed International Games, Inc., to market Uno, with offices behind his funeral parlor. The games were produced by Lewis Saltzman of Saltzman Printers in Maywood, Illinois.

In 1992, International Games became part of the Mattel family of companies.

Official rules

The aim of the game is to be the first player to score 500 points, achieved (usually over several rounds of play) by being the first to play all of one's own cards and scoring points for the cards still held by the other players.

The 2018 edition of the game consists of 112 cards: 25 in each of four color suits (red, yellow, green, blue), each suit consisting of one zero, two each of 1 through 9, and two each of the action cards "Skip", "Draw Two", and "Reverse". The deck also contains four "Wild" cards, four "Wild Draw Four", one "Wild Shuffle Hands" and three "Wild Customizable". Sets manufactured prior to 2018 do not contain these last two types of Wild cards, for a total of 108 cards in the deck.

For each hand, a dealer is determined by having each player randomly draw one card from the deck. The player with the highest number card deals, and all cards are reshuffled into the deck to begin the dealing.

To start a hand, seven cards are dealt to each player, and the top card of the remaining deck is flipped over and set aside to begin the discard pile. The player to the dealer's left plays first unless the first card on the discard pile is an action or Wild card (see below). On a player's turn, they must do one of the following:
 play one card matching the discard in color, number, or symbol
 play a Wild card, or a playable Wild Draw Four card (see restriction below)
 draw the top card from the deck, and play it if possible

Cards are played by laying them face-up on top of the discard pile. Play initially proceeds clockwise around the table.

Action or Wild cards have the following effects:

 A player who draws a playable card from the deck must either play or keep that card and may play no other card from their hand on that turn.
 A player may play a Wild card at any time, even if that player has other playable cards.
 A player may play a Wild Draw Four card only if that player has no cards matching the current color. The player may have cards of a different color matching the current number or symbol or a Wild card and still play the Wild Draw Four card. A player who plays a Wild Draw Four may be challenged by the next player in sequence (see Penalties) to prove that their hand meets this condition.
 If not otherwise challenged, an illegally played Wild Draw Four stays without penalty for its player.
 When playing a Wild or Wild Draw Four card, a player may declare the current color as the next one to be matched.
 If the draw deck runs out during play, the top discard is set aside and the rest of the pile is shuffled to create a new deck. Play then proceeds normally.
 It is illegal to trade cards of any sort with another player.

A player who plays their penultimate card must call "Uno" as a warning to the other players.

The first player to get rid of their last card ("going out") wins the hand and scores points for the cards held by the other players. Number cards count their face value, all action cards count 20, and Wild and Wild Draw Four cards count 50. If a Draw Two or Wild Draw Four card is played to go out, the next player in the sequence must draw the appropriate number of cards before the score is tallied.

The first player to score 500 points wins the game.

Penalties
 If a player does not call "Uno" after laying down their penultimate card and is caught before the next player in sequence starts to take a turn (i.e., plays a card from their hand, draws from the deck, or touches the discard pile), they must draw two cards as a penalty. If the player is not caught in time or remembers to call "Uno" before being caught, no penalty applies to that player.
 If a player plays a Wild Draw Four card, the next player in turn order may choose to challenge its use. The player who used the Wild Draw Four must privately show their hand to the challenging player in order to demonstrate that they had no prior matching colored cards. If the challenge is successful, then the challenged player must draw four cards instead and play continues with the challenger. Otherwise, the challenger must draw six cards – the four cards they were already required to draw plus two more cards – and lose their turn. In either case, the Wild Draw Four stays with its chosen color.

Two-player game
In a two-player game, the Reverse card acts like a Skip card; when played, the other player misses a turn.

House rules
The following house rules are suggested in the Uno instructions to alter the game:
 Progressive or Stacking Uno: If a draw card is played, and the following player has a card with the same symbol, they can play that card and "stack" the penalty, which adds to the current penalty and passes it to the following player (although a +4 cannot be stacked on a +2, or vice versa). This house rule is so commonly used that there was widespread Twitter surprise in 2019 when Mattel stated that stacking was not part of the standard rules of Uno.
 Seven-O: Every time a "7" is played, the player who played the "7" card must trade their hand with another player of their choice. Every time a "0" is played, all players pass their hands to the next player in the current direction of play.
 Jump-In: If a player has exactly the same card (both number and color) as the top card of the discard pile, they may play it immediately, even if it is not their turn. The game then continues as if that player had just taken their turn.

2018 rule changes
The two new types of Wild cards have the following functions:

 Wild Shuffle Hands: The player using this card collects all cards held by all players, then shuffles and re-deals them. 
 Wild Customizable: These cards are blank and can have a house rule assigned to them.

Either type can be played on any turn and is worth 40 points when a player goes out.

Card and deck styles 

Modern Uno action cards bear symbols which denote their action, except for the Wild cards which still bear the word "Wild". Before the design change, such cards in English versions of the game had letters only. Earlier English versions can be recognized by the absence of the white rim that surrounds the edge of most Uno cards.

Other versions of the game use symbols and images in both old and new designs, especially ones with Wild cards that do not bear the word "Wild". There are also language-free versions of the newer styles that do not bear the word "Wild" but have the same styling.

The 2010 "Uno Mod" edition uses symbols instead of letters or numbers.

On September 16, 2017, Mattel released Uno ColorAdd, which was designed specifically for those suffering from color blindness.

On October 1, 2019, Mattel released a Braille version of their game with Mark Riccobono, president of the National Federation of the Blind. Riccobono said in a press release, "The fact that a blind person is now able to play a classic game of UNO straight out of the box with both blind and sighted friends or family members is a truly meaningful moment for our community."

Special Uno games 

  Uno 50th Anniversary (2021)
 Uno Wild Twists (2022)
 Uno All Wild (2022)
 Uno Attack (Uno Extreme in the UK and Canada) (1999)
  Uno Attack Jurassic World (2018) 
 Uno Attack Refill Deck
 Uno Bingo (1997)
 Uno Blast (2012)
 Uno Blitzo (2000)
 Uno Choo-Choo (2011)
 Uno Color Screen
 Uno Deluxe
 Uno Dare (2014)
 Uno Dice (1987, 1996, 2011)
 Uno Dominoes (1986)
 Electronic Uno
 Uno Flash (2007)
 Uno Flip (2009) (Target Store Exclusive)
 Uno Flip! (2019)
 Giant Uno (2016)
 Giant BTS Uno (2020)
 Uno H2O (2004)
 Uno H2O To Go
 Uno Hearts (1994)
 Uno Junior (1992)
 King Size Uno (1994)
 Uno Madness (1995)
 Uno Moo (2008, 2014)
 Uno Party! (2022)
 Uno Power Grab
 Uno Reflex
 Uno Roboto
 Uno Royal Revenge (2014)
 Uno Rummy Up (1993)
 Uno Spin (2005)
 Uno Spin Hannah Montana (2005)
 Uno Spin One Piece (Japan)
 Uno Spin To Go (2010)
 Uno Stacko (1994)
 Travel Uno Stacko
 Uno Tippo (2009)
 Uno Slam
 Uno Tiki Twist (2014)
 Uno Wild Jackpot (2016)
 Uno Wild Tiles (1982)
 Get Wild for Uno (2016)
 Uno Minecraft (2018)
 Uno Showdown Supercharged (2020)
 Uno Triple Play (2021)
 Uno Go! (2022)

Uno H2O
Uno H2O  differs from the standard game in that the cards are transparent and waterproof. Play is identical to the standard pre-2018 Uno game, with the addition of two types of "Wild Downpour" cards. When one of these is played, all other players must draw either one or two cards as indicated on the card. The player using it may then declare the next color to be matched.

Video games 

 Uno (handheld video game – 2000)
 Uno (handheld video game for the Game Boy Color of the classic Uno board game)
  Uno DX (Japanese exclusive Sega Saturn game by Mitsui & Co. – 1998)
 Uno (PlayStation Network)
 Uno (Xbox Live Arcade)
 Uno Rush (Xbox Live Arcade)
 Uno Challenge (mobile version of the classic Uno board game)
 Uno Free Fall (puzzle game for mobile phones)
 Uno 52 (Nintendo Game Boy Advance)
 Super Uno (Super Famicom)
 Uno (Facebook) (Adobe Flash–based version of the classic Uno card game produced by GameHouse Studios)
 Uno (iPhone) Features online and local play. Produced by Gameloft
 Uno (iPad) The same as on the iPhone, but with enhanced graphics. Produced by Gameloft
 Uno (Android) Released as three versions: SD, HD and Free with adverts. Produced by Gameloft
 Uno (DSi)
 Uno (WiiWare) Produced by Gameloft
 Uno & Friends (various platforms)
 Pocket Uno
 Uno and Uno & Friends for Windows Phone
 Uno Undercover (Windows)
 Uno (2016 video game for PC, PlayStation 4, and Xbox One by Ubisoft)
 Uno – 2017 video game (release of 2016 game on the Nintendo Switch), produced by Ubisoft

 UNO! – developed and published by Mattel163 in 2017

Variations 

Many variations from standard gameplay exist, such as Elimination Uno, Speed Uno and Pirate Uno.

In 2018, Mattel released a spin-off of Uno entitled Dos; the game is differentiated primarily by having a "center row" of discard piles, where pairs of cards that add up to the sum of a card on the top of one of the piles may be discarded.

The game can be played with two decks of standard playing cards, if the jokers are marked up as the zeroes of the four suits, and the royalty treated as the special cards.

Spin-offs

Uno Slot 
In 2002, International Gaming Technology (IGT) released a video slot machine based on Uno.

Uno: The Game Show 
In March 2013, it was announced that Mattel and the Gurin Company were teaming up to create a game show based on the card game, produced as a half-hour daily strip with a $100,000 cash jackpot along with a primetime version in which contestants competed for 1 million dollars. However, the idea was scrapped later on.

Film adaptation 
On February 4, 2021, an action heist comedy film based on the game was announced to be in development for Mattel Films with Lil Yachty of record label Quality Control Music developing and being eyed for the lead role alongside the label's managers Kevin "Coach K" Lee and Pierre "P" Thomas, and Brian Sher for Quality Films producing, Marcy Kelly writing, and Robbie Brenner and Kevin McKeon leading the project as executive producer and supervising producer, respectively.

Similar games
Uno is a member of the shedding family of card games. The shedding family of card games consists of games where the objective is to get rid of all your cards while preventing the other players from getting rid of their cards.

 Crazy Eights
 Black Jack (Switch)
 Switch (card game)
 Eleusis
 Last Card
 Macau
 Mao
 Mau Mau (game)
 O'NO 99
 One Card (game)
 Phase 10
 SKIP-BO
 Taki
 Whot!

Reception
Games magazine included Uno in their "Top 100 Games of 1980", noting that the game "borrows so much from the familiar card game of Crazy Eights" but that "it's a much better game and just as simple to
learn".

Games magazine included Uno in their "Top 100 Games of 1982", noting that its "popularity is based on its simplicity, not on its strategic aspects" and that "the game has a rummylike scoring system".

References

Bibliography
 Current official rules, from Mattel
 Official Mattel Uno site
 Uno Rules at UnoRules.org
 Uno Variations at UnoVariations.com
 Uno variants at pagat.com
 Uno News at Wonkavator

External links

 Uno H2O rules
 

 
Card games introduced in 1971
Dedicated deck card games
Mattel
Shedding-type card games
American inventions
Games of mental skill